1582 (MDLXXXII) was a common year starting on Monday (link will display the full calendar) in the Julian calendar, and a common year starting on Friday (link will display full calendar) of the Proleptic Gregorian calendar. This year saw the beginning of the Gregorian calendar switch, when the papal bull Inter gravissimas introduced the Gregorian calendar, adopted by Spain, Portugal, the Polish–Lithuanian Commonwealth and most of present-day Italy from the start. In these countries, the year continued as normal through Thursday, October 4; the next day became Friday, October 15, like a common year starting on Friday. France followed two months later, letting Sunday, December 9 be followed by Monday, December 20. Other countries continued using the Julian calendar, switching calendars in later years, and the complete conversion to the Gregorian calendar was not entirely done until 1923.

Events 
 January–June 
 January 15 – Russia cedes its conquered areas in Livonia (Northern Latvia and Southern Estonia), to the Polish–Lithuanian Commonwealth.
 February 10 – François, Duke of Anjou, arrives in the Netherlands, where he is personally welcomed by William the Silent.
 February 24 – Pope Gregory XIII proclaims the Gregorian Calendar, to come into effect later in the year.
 March 9 – Scryer Edward Kelley arrives at John Dee's house in London. They practice angelic magic together and Dee develops the Enochian language.
 April 2 – 1582 Ancuancu earthquake: Ancuancu (in modern-day La Paz Department, Bolivia) is struck by an earthquake that reportedly buries all of the inhabitants, except for one chief, who reportedly loses the ability to speak. On the place where the village had stood, the Jacha Kalla (Achocalla) valley is formed as a result of the earthquake.
 April 3 – Battle of Temmokuzan: Unable to reverse the collapse of Takeda clan, Takeda Katsuyori and his household commit suicide.
 April 14 – King James VI of Scotland signs a charter creating the Tounis College, which becomes the University of Edinburgh.
 April 16 – Spanish conquistador Hernando de Lerma founds the settlement of Salta, Argentina.
 April – Hashiba Hideyoshi begins the Siege of Takamatsu Castle.
 May–August – Robert Browne and his Brownist congregationalist companions are obliged to leave England, and go to Middelburg in the Netherlands.
 June 21 – The Incident at Honnō-ji occurs in Kyoto, Japan.

 July–December 
 July 2 – Battle of Yamazaki: Counterattacking forces led by Toyotomi Hideyoshi decisively defeat Akechi Mitsuhide's smaller army; Akechi is killed while retreating to his domain.
 July 26 – Battle of Ponta Delgada (War of the Portuguese Succession): Spanish admiral Santa Cruz decisively defeats a larger mercenary fleet from France, England, supporters of the Portuguese claimant António, Prior of Crato, and the Dutch Republic, under Filippo di Piero Strozzi (who is killed) off the Azores, the first engagement between large fleets of galleons, operating at any great distance from the mainland.
 August 22 – Raid of Ruthven in Scotland: A political conspiracy of Presbyterian nobles abduct King James VI.
 October 4 of Julian calendar (Thursday) – Pope Gregory XIII implements the Gregorian calendar. In Italy, Poland, Portugal, and Spain, October 4 of this year is followed directly by October 15.
 November 29 – Future English playwright William Shakespeare marries Anne Hathaway.
 December 9 of Julian calendar (Sunday) – France makes the next day Monday, December 20 of the Gregorian Calendar.

 Date unknown 
 Kumbum is founded in Tibet.
 In Ming Dynasty China:
 Jesuit Matteo Ricci is allowed to enter the country.
 The earliest reference is made to the publishing of private newspapers in Beijing.
 The sultanate of Morocco begins to press southward, in search of a greater share of the trans-Saharan trade.
 The Cagayan battles in the Philippines, the only recorded clashes between European regular soldiers and samurai warriors.
 University of Würzburg refounded.
 The Douai-Rheims Bible New Testament is published.
 Battle of Dewair

Births 

 January 6
 Alonso de Contreras, Spanish privateer and writer (d. 1641)
 Jaroslav Borzita of Martinice, Bohemian noble (d. 1649)
 January 7 – Magdalene of Brandenburg, Landgravine consort of Hesse-Darmstadt (1598–1616) (d. 1616)
 January 26 – Giovanni Lanfranco, Italian painter (d. 1647)
 January 28 – John Barclay, Scottish satirist and Latin poet (d. 1621)
 January 30 – George II, Duke of Pomerania (d. 1617)
 February 8 – Matthias Bernegger, German philologist (d. 1640)
 February 17 – George, Duke of Brunswick-Lüneburg (d. 1641)
 February 22 – John Ratcliffe, English politician and soldier (d. 1627)
 March 15
 Daniel Featley, English theologian and controversialist (d. 1645)
 Deodat del Monte, Flemish painter, architect (d. 1644)
 March 22 – John Williams, Welsh clergyman and political advisor to King James I (d. 1650)
 March 31 – Duchess Sophie of Prussia, Duchess consort of Courland (1609–1610) (d. 1610)
 April 8 – (bapt.) Phineas Fletcher, English poet (d. 1650)
 April 11 – Justus de Harduwijn, Dutch Catholic priest and poet (d. 1636)
 May 1 – Marco da Gagliano, Italian composer of the early Baroque era (d. 1643)
 May 5 – John Frederick, Duke of Württemberg (1608–1628) (d. 1628)
 June 26 – Johannes Schultz, German composer (d. 1653)
 June 28 – William Fiennes, 1st Viscount Saye and Sele, English nobleman and politician (d. 1662)
 July 27 – Sir John Isham, 1st Baronet, English Member of Parliament (d. 1651)
 August 11 – Sabina Catharina of East Frisia, Countess of Rietberg (1586–1618) (d. 1618)
 August 17 – John Matthew Rispoli, major Maltese philosopher of great erudition (d. 1639)
 August 26 – Humilis of Bisignano, Italian Franciscan friar and saint (d. 1637)
 August 27 – Maria Amalia of Nassau-Dillenburg, German noble (d. 1635)
 August 28
 Taichang Emperor, of the Ming Dynasty of China (d. 1620)
 Hans Meinhard von Schönberg, German military commander (d. 1616)
 September 25 – Archduchess Eleanor of Austria (d. 1620)
 September 26 – Eitel Frederick von Hohenzollern-Sigmaringen, German Catholic cardinal (d. 1625)
 October 2 – Augustus, Count Palatine of Sulzbach, Count Palatine of Neuburg (1614–1632) (d. 1632)
 October 17 – Johann Gerhard, Lutheran church leader (d. 1637)
 October 19 – Dmitri Ivanovich, Russian Tsarevich (d. 1591)
 October 21 – John Ernest of Nassau-Siegen, German general (d. 1617)
 October 22 – Francesco Piccolomini, Italian Jesuit (d. 1651)
 November 2 – Elizabeth Jane Weston, English Czech poet (d. 1612)
 November 21 – François Maynard, French poet (d. 1646)
 November 27 – Pierre Dupuy, French historian (d. 1651)
 November 30 – Anselm Casimir Wambold von Umstadt, Archbishop of Mainz (d. 1647)
 December 10 – William Chappell, Irish bishop (d. 1649)
 December 16 – Robert Bertie, 1st Earl of Lindsey, English adventurer and soldier (d. 1642)
 December 23 – Severo Bonini, Italian composer (d. 1663)
 date unknown
 Giovanni Francesco Abela, Maltese writer (d. 1655)
 Giulio Alenio, Italian Jesuit missionary (d. 1649)
 Gregorio Allegri, Italian composer (d. 1652)
 John Bainbridge, English astronomer (d. 1648)
 Richard Corbet, English poet and bishop (d. 1635)
 William Juxon, Archbishop of Canterbury (d. 1663)
 Thomas Moulson, Lord Mayor of London (d. 1638)
 David Teniers the Elder, Flemish painter (d. 1649)
 Francis Windebank, English politician (d. 1646)
 Jacomina de Witte, politically influential Dutch woman  (d. 1661)
 Jakub Zadzik, Polish nobleman and diplomat (d. 1642)
 probable – Sigismondo d'India, Italian composer (d. 1629)

Deaths 

 January 23 – Jean Bauhin, French physician (b. 1511)
 January 26 – Thomas Platter, Swiss humanist scholar (b. 1499)
 February 18 – Sakuma Nobumori, Japanese retainer and samurai (b. 1527)
 March 14 – Elisabeth of Hesse, Electress Palatine by marriage (1576-1582) (b. 1539)
 March 18 – Juan Jauregui, attempted assassin of William I of Orange (b. 1562)
 March 22 – Daniel Brendel von Homburg, Roman Catholic archbishop (b. 1522)
 March 29 – Philip de' Medici, Italian noble, Grand Prince of Tuscany (b. 1577)
 April 3 – Takeda Katsuyori, Japanese daimyō of Takeda Clan (b. 1546)
 April 16 – Oyamada Nobushige, Japanese samurai (b. 1545)
 April 21 – Francisco de Toledo, Spanish soldier and politician (b. 1515)
 May 3 – Giorgio Mainerio, Italian composer (b. 1530)
 May 5 – Charlotte of Bourbon, Princess consort of Orange, married to William I of Orange (b. 1547)
 June 13 – Matteo Tafuri, Italian alchemist (b. 1492)
 June 21
 Oda Nobunaga, Japanese daimyō of the Oda Clan (b. 1534) (forced suicide)
 Oda Nobutada, Japanese samurai, oldest son of Nobunaga (b. 1557) (forced suicide)
 Anayama Nobukimi, Japanese military commander (b. 1541)
 June 23 – Shimizu Muneharu, Japanese military commander (b. 1537)
 July 2 – Akechi Mitsuhide, Japanese samurai and warlord (b. 1528)
 July 3 – James Crichton, Scottish scholar (b. 1560)
 July 7 – Kawajiri Hidetaka, Japanese samurai (b. 1527)
 July 17 – Jacques Peletier du Mans, French mathematician (b. 1517)
 September 23 – Louis, Duke of Montpensier (b. 1513)
 September 28 – George Buchanan, Scottish humanist scholar (b. 1506)
 October 4 – Teresa of Ávila, Spanish Carmelite nun, poet and saint (b. 1515)
 October 21 – Laurent Joubert, French physician (b. 1529)
 November 21 – Diego, Prince of Asturias, Portuguese prince (b. 1575)
 December 11 – Fernando Álvarez de Toledo, 3rd Duke of Alba, Spanish general (b. 1507)
 Date unknown:
 Wu Cheng'en, Chinese novelist and poet of the Ming dynasty
 Hans Hendrik van Paesschen, Flemish architect (b. 1510)
 Zhang Juzheng, Ming dynasty official (b. 1525)
 Takeda Nobukado, Japanese samurai (b. 1529)
 Sen Soulintha, Laotian king of Lan Xang (b. 1511)
 Anthony Lorinthia Geriasarch, Prussian general (b. 1493)

References